Eublemma apicata  is a species of moth of the  family Erebidae. It is found in Tanzania, Malawi, Zimbabwe and South Africa .

References

External links

Boletobiinae
Lepidoptera of Malawi
Lepidoptera of South Africa
Lepidoptera of Zimbabwe
Moths of Sub-Saharan Africa
Moths described in 1898